The Hua Hin Challenger was a tennis tournament for professional male and female tennis players played on outdoor hard courts. The event was classified as a $125,000 ATP Challenger Tour and WTA 125K series tournament and was held in Hua Hin District, Thailand, in 2015 and 2017.

Past finals

Men's singles

Women's singles

Men's doubles

Women's doubles

External links 
 ITF search
 WTA tournament profile
 ATP Challenger Tour website

Hua Hin Challenger
2015 establishments in Thailand
2017 disestablishments in Thailand
Tennis
ATP Challenger Tour
WTA 125 tournaments
Hard court tennis tournaments
November sporting events
Recurring sporting events established in 2015
Recurring events disestablished in 2017
Tennis
Tennis tournaments in Thailand
Defunct tennis tournaments in Thailand